"Maji SUNSHINE" is a single by Hey! Say! JUMP. It was released on May 11, 2016. The title song was picked up as the CM song for Kose Cosmeport's Sun Cut. It's a summer song that describes the feelings of a boy in love.

The Regular Edition contains "We are Otokonoko!", which is the ending theme for TV Tokyo's Little Tokyo Life, a new song titled "Eve", and the original karaoke version for each song.

The Limited Edition 1 contained junior sub-group Hey! Say! 7's new song "Party Monster", and the DVD includes the PV and making-of for "Maji SUNSHINE". Meanwhile, the Limited Edition 2 contains sub-group Hey! Say! BEST's "Speed It Up", and its DVD includes a special footage called "Dai-2-kai Jan Jan Oshiete!! Jan! Jan! JUMQ".

Regular Edition
CD
 "Maji SUNSHINE"
 "We are Otokonoko!"
 "Eve"
 "Maji SUNSHINE" (Original Karaoke)
 "We are Otokonoko!" (Original Karaoke)
 "Eve" (Original Karaoke)

Limited Edition 1
CD
 "Maji SUNSHINE"
 "Party Monster" - Hey! Say! 7

DVD
 "Maji SUNSHINE" (PV & Making of)

Limited Edition 2
CD
 "Maji SUNSHINE"
 "Speed It Up" - Hey! Say! BEST

DVD
 Special Footage Dai-2-kai Jan Jan Oshiete!! Jan! Jan! JUMQ

References

2016 singles
Hey! Say! JUMP songs
Oricon Weekly number-one singles
Billboard Japan Hot 100 number-one singles